Ben Ryan Wilson (born 15 March 1986 in Sheffield, England) is a professional speedway rider.

Career
Wilson  started his career with the Sheffield Prowlers on his 15th birthday in the Conference League. He was selected as the Sheffield Tigers reserve for the 2003 season, and after a slow start he continued into 2004, where he showed more promise. In 2005, Wilson moved up to second string in which he partnered Sean Wilson, and continued to improve his average throughout the year.

2006 was Ben's most successful season to date. His form from 2005 was noticed and was signed to double up with Wolverhampton Wolves in the Elite League, as well as riding for Sheffield. He also won the British Under-21 Championship at the Norfolk Arena, by beating Daniel King and Lewis Bridger. This result earned Wilson a reserve position at the British Grand Prix that year. He also came second in the Premier League Pairs Championship with team-mate Ricky Ashworth, only beaten by the holders Glasgow Tigers. In 2007, Wilson was once again re-signed by the Sheffield Tigers to fill the third heat leader role.

After two seasons out of the sport he signed to ride for Stoke Potters in the National League in 2014.

References 

1986 births
Living people
British speedway riders
Plymouth Gladiators speedway riders
Sheffield Tigers riders
Wolverhampton Wolves riders